The women's 400 metre freestyle event at the 2016 Summer Olympics took place on 7 August, at the Olympic Aquatics Stadium.

Summary
U.S. distance ace Katie Ledecky put together a powerful attack on her existing world record to become the first Olympic champion in the event for the Americans, since Brooke Bennett topped the podium in 2000. Leading from the start, Ledecky quickly dropped two seconds under a world-record pace, as she pulled away further from the field to smash her own record with a gold-medal time in 3:56.46. Trailing the leader by almost five seconds, Great Britain's distance-freestyle swimmer Jazmin Carlin fought off a tight battle against Ledecky's teammate Leah Smith on the final lap for the silver in 4:01.23. Meanwhile, Smith faded down the stretch to pick up a bronze with a 4:01.92.

Boglárka Kapás missed the podium in fourth with a Hungarian record of 4:02.37 from the outside lane, while Canada's Brittany MacLean posted a fifth-place time in 4:04.69. Australian duo Tamsin Cook (4:05.30) and Jessica Ashwood (4:05.68) kept a close race to take the sixth and seventh spots respectively, separated by a 0.4-second margin. France's three-time Olympian Coralie Balmy rounded out the top eight with a 4:06.98.

Earlier in the prelims, Ledecky opened her first individual race of the Games with a new Olympic record of 3:58.71 to immediately lock the top seed for the final, clearing a four-minute barrier at the Games for the first time, and slashing 2.74 seconds off the mark set in London 2012 by reigning champion Camille Muffat of France, who was killed on a helicopter crash in March 2015.

The medals for the competition were presented by Nita Ambani, India,  IOC member, and the gifts were presented by Dr. Margo Mountjoy, Bureau Member of the FINA.

Records
Prior to this competition, the existing world and Olympic records were as follows.

The following records were established during the competition:

Competition format

The competition consisted of two rounds: heats and a final. The swimmers with the best 8 times in the heats advanced to the final. Swim-offs were used as necessary to break ties for advancement to the next round.

Results

Heats
The heats began 2:28 pm.

Final

References

Women's 00400 metre freestyle
Olympics
2016 in women's swimming
Women's events at the 2016 Summer Olympics